Tricyrtis macrantha, the yellow Chinese toad lily, is a species of flowering plant in the family Liliaceae. It is native to Japan's Kōchi Prefecture on the island of Shikoku. A perennial, it prefer partial to full shade and permanently wet soil, and is hardy to USDA zone 4.

References

macrantha
Garden plants of Asia
Endemic flora of Japan
Plants described in 1888